The term Elephant grass may refer to the following grass species:

 The Asian Miscanthus giganteus, also known as giant miscanthus, commonly used as a biomass crop
 The African Cenchrus purpureus, also known as Napier grass, Uganda grass or giant king grass
 The Asian Arundo donax, also known as giant cane, giant reed
 The Eurasian Saccharum ravennae, also known as ravennagrass or ekra